Temperamental may refer to:

Temperamental (Everything but the Girl album)
Temperamental (Divinyls album)
 The Temperamentals, a 2009 play about the founding of the Mattachine Society